Mihai Panc (born 7 April 1981 in Reșița) is a Romanian football defender.

Playing career 

Panc started out at local club Gloria Reșița. He made eight appearances during this stint, scoring two goals, before moving to Extensiv Craiova.  His performances at Extensiv earned him a move to Steaua București, where he would make only four appearances before moving again, this time to Progresul București.  After a brief spell at Gloria Bistriţa, making 10 appearances, he moved to FK Baku.

His debut in Liga I came on 4 March 2000, against Dinamo București.

References

External links 
Profile on FK Baku Official Site

1981 births
Living people
Sportspeople from Reșița
Romanian footballers
Association football defenders
FC Baku players
Expatriate footballers in Azerbaijan
FC Steaua București players
ACF Gloria Bistrița players
FC Progresul București players
FC Politehnica Iași (2010) players
Liga I players
Romanian expatriate sportspeople in Azerbaijan